Pedro Ribera (1465–1530) was a Roman Catholic prelate who served as Bishop of Lugo (1500–1530).

Biography
Pedro Ribera was born in Madrigal, Spain in 1465. On 26 June 1500, he was appointed during the papacy of Pope Alexander VI as Bishop of Lugo. He served as Bishop of Lugo until his death in 1530.

References

External links and additional sources
 (for Chronology of Bishops) 
 (for Chronology of Bishops) 

1465 births
1530 deaths
16th-century Roman Catholic bishops in Spain
Bishops appointed by Pope Alexander VI